John McLeod Murphy (February 14, 1827 – June 1, 1871) was an officer in the United States Navy during the American Civil War.

Biography
Murphy was born in Westchester County, New York, and was appointed midshipman on August 10, 1841. He resigned as a passed midshipman on May 10, 1852, after his last mission as an assistant on John G. Barnard's survey of the Isthmus of Tehuantepec. He went into the private sector, working as a first officer on the Collins' line of steamships, a city surveyor for the city of New York, Chief Engineer of the Brooklyn Navy Yard, and lastly as a member of the New York State Senate (4th D.) in 1860 and 1861.

American Civil War
Murphy reentered service at the beginning of the Civil War as a colonel in the engineers, forming the 15th New York Regiment of Engineers, serving in the Army of the Potomac. He was appointed acting lieutenant of the U.S. Navy on December 4, 1862, taking many veterans of his regiment along with fresh volunteers from New York. He took command of gunboat Carondelet on March 4, 1863, skippering that ship during the joint Army‑Navy Expedition in Steele's Bayou under Rear Admiral David Dixon Porter from March 18 to March 24, in which he landed with two boat howitzers and 300 men near Rolling Fork to hold that place until the Union ships could cover it with their guns. One of his officers was Acting Volunteer Lieutenant Julius H. Kroehl.

He next took Carondelet off Vicksburg, Mississippi engaging batteries at that Confederate fortress many times from May 18 to July 3, being commended by Admiral Porter for energetic attention to orders and ready cooperation with Army corps commanders assaulting the fortress. Acting Lieutenant Murphy relinquished command of the gunboat on September 1, 1863, to serve as a recruiter in New York and resigned his commission on July 30, 1864. Attempts to re-enter politic office were unsuccessful.

Personal
He was the son of Thomas and Maria (née Warner) Murphy, and the brother of Augustus Howard Murphy and William Jay Murphy, both of whom were Sandy Hook pilots. He married Mary Theresa Mooney in 1848; the couple had at least six children:  Walter M., Maria B., Mary Theresa, Joseph D., John K., and Mary Elsie.

Death
He died in New York City on June 1, 1871, and is interred at Calvary Cemetery in Queens, New York.

He should not be confused with his nephew, John McLeod Murphy (1858–1919), who served as a New York City fireman and patented the third-rail safety system for electric trolleys.

Namesake
USS Murphy (DD-603) was named for him.

References

Appleton's Cyclopedia of American Biography, edited by James Grant Wilson, John Fiske and Stanley L. Klos, Six volumes, New York: D. Appleton and Company, 1887–89.
 New York Times, "Death of Col. John McLeod Murphy", June 2, 1871
 (ORN) Official Records of the Union and Confederate Navies in the War of the Rebellion. Series I: 27 volumes. Series II: 3 volumes. Washington: Government Printing Office, 1894–1922.

United States Navy officers
1827 births
1871 deaths
Union Navy officers
People of New York (state) in the American Civil War
Democratic Party New York (state) state senators
American expatriates in Mexico
People from Westchester County, New York
19th-century American politicians